The Nine Muses, Or, Poems Written by Nine severall Ladies Upon the death of the late Famous John Dryden, Esq. (London: Richard Basset, 1700) was an elegiac volume of poetry published pseudonymously. The contributors were English women writers, each of whom signed their poems with the name of one of the Muses. The collection was edited by Delarivier Manley (who wrote as "Melpomene" and "Thalia") and includes pieces by Susanna Centlivre ("perhaps," according to Blain et al.), Sarah Fyge Egerton ("Erato", "Euterpe", and "Terpsichore"), Mary Pix ("Clio"), Catherine Trotter ("Calliope"), and Sarah Piers ("Urania"). The poet writing as "Polimnia" (the Muse of Rhetorick) has not been identified; her initials are "Mrs. D. E."

Etext
Transcription of The Nine muses, or, Poems written by nine several ladies upon the death of the late famous John Dryden, Esq (1700) (Oxford Text Archive)

Notes

References
Blain, Virginia, et al. The Feminist Companion to Literature in English: Women Writers from the Middle Ages to the Present. New Haven/London: Yale UP, 1990.
Buck, Claire, ed. The Bloomsbury Guide to Women's Literature. New York: Prentice Hall, 1992. 862-863.
Medoff, Jeslyn. "New Light on Sarah Fyge (Field, Egerton)." Tulsa Studies in Women's Literature 1.2. (Autumn 1982):155-175.
"Urania: The Divine Muse. On the Death of John Dryden, Esq. By the Honourable the Lady P[iers]." Kissing the Rod: An Anthology of Seventeenth-Century Women's Verse. Germaine Greer et al., eds. New York: Farrar Straus Giroux, 1988. 448-451.

English poetry
1700 works
Greek Muses
Literature by women